Gallison Hall is a historic home located near Charlottesville in Albemarle County, Virginia, United States.  It was designed by the architect Stanhope Johnson in the Georgian Revival style, and built between 1931 and 1933. It consists of a 2½-story, five-bay, brick center section with a steeply pitched hipped roof, flanked by -story, three-bay, gable-roofed wings connected by hyphens.  At each end are a seven-bay brick arcades connected to a -story two-bay gable-roofed garage on the east and an identical arcade connected to an octagonal gazebo brick on the west. The house is set among English gardens designed by Charles F. Gillette.

It was added to the National Register of Historic Places in 1990.

References

Houses on the National Register of Historic Places in Virginia
Georgian Revival architecture in Virginia
Houses completed in 1933
National Register of Historic Places in Albemarle County, Virginia
Houses in Albemarle County, Virginia